Kampong Sungai Buloh is a village in the north-east of Brunei-Muara District, Brunei. The population was 3,857 in 2016. It comprises the original village settlement as well as the public housing area STKRJ Kampong Sungai Buloh.

Geography 
Kampong Sungai Buloh is one of the villages in Mukim Mentiri, a mukim in Brunei-Muara District. As a village subdivision, it borders Kampong Salar to the north-east, Kampong Mentiri and RPN Panchor Mengkubau to the south, and Kampong Tanah Jambu to the west.

Facilities

Mosque 
Kampong Sungai Buloh Mosque is the village mosque; it was inaugurated on 7 October 1983. The mosque can accommodate 370 worshippers.

References 

Villages in Brunei-Muara District
Public housing estates in Brunei